Looping in education is the practice of moving groups of children up from one grade to the next with the same teacher. This system, which is also called multiyear grouping, lasts from two to five years and, as the class moves on, the teacher loops back to pick another group of children. This practice is particularly prevalent in Europe and Asia.

Background 
It is believed that young learners experience a complex period of development and that it requires consistency, which can be provided by the looping learning framework. Looping allows teachers to address this issue by providing continuity as well as a stable and secure learning environment. It had its origin in Waldorf education, which spread in the United States in 1928 after it was first introduced in Europe. During the 19th and early 20th centuries, the looping system was implicit in the educational structure, particularly in one-room schools where there was only one teacher available for all students.

Outcomes 
According to its proponents, looping offers several benefits and these include an improved student-teacher relationship due to the stability and emotional security provided to the learners as well as a greater opportunity for teachers to get to know them, leading to individualization of their learning program. It is also suggested that it provides more instructional time since there is less time required at the beginning of the school year on routines of procedures and familiarization. The "carryover" relationship keeps the class from starting from scratch on the next year of the loop, allowing them to gain up to six extra weeks of instructional time. Looping also facilitates better social interaction and could enhance a sense of family and community within the classroom.

There are also studies that show students who loop tend to have better attendance. It is also associated with improved reading and math performance as well as improved conflict resolution and teamwork capabilities.

References

Educational stages